This is an overview of the 2004 Iranian legislative election in Tehran, Rey, Shemiranat and Eslamshahr electoral district. Alliance of Builders of Islamic Iran was able to win 29 out of 30 seats in the constituency in the first round. 

A total number of 1,965,666 votes were cast in the first round.

Results

First round 
The official results are as follows:

Guardian council intervention and run-off (2005) 

After the official results were declared by the Ministry of Interior, the Alliance of Builders of Islamic Iran protested. On 16 March 2004, the Guardian Council decreed that 29 candidates are elected, instead of 25 and only 2 candidates made it to the run-off, instead of 10. There was a confusing similarity between the conservative "Ali Abbaspour Tehrani Fard" of Alliance of Builders of Islamic Iran —who was initially ranked 30th with 431,256 votes— and the reformist "Ali Abbaspour Tehrani Asl" listed by the Coalition For Iran, with 140,311 votes. Abbaspour Tehrani Fard was promoted to the 12th place.

News Website Jamaran cites the recounted votes as below:

The run-off election was scheduled to be held on 7 May 2004 between the reformist Alireza Mahjoub and the conservative Zeinab Kadkhoda. The Iranian Parliament passed a bill to postpone the elections, due to the vastness of the constituency and its expenses. It was held along with the presidential election on 17 June 2005.

Notes and references

External links

Parliamentary elections in Tehran
2000s in Tehran
2004 elections in Iran
2005 elections in Iran